Andy Murray defeated David Ferrer in the final, 2–6, 6–4, 7–6(7–1) to win the men's singles tennis title at the 2013 Miami Open. It was his second Miami Open title.

Novak Djokovic was the two-time defending champion, but lost in the fourth round to Tommy Haas.

This was the first edition of the tournament not to feature an American in the quarterfinals, and also the first all-European quarterfinal lineup at the tournament.

Seeds
All seeds receive a bye into the second round.

Draw

Finals

Top half

Section 1

Section 2

Section 3

Section 4

Bottom half

Section 5

Section 6

Section 7

Section 8

Qualifying

Seeds

Qualifiers

Lucky losers

Draw

First qualifier

Second qualifier

Third qualifier

Fourth qualifier

Fifth qualifier

Sixth qualifier

Seventh qualifier

Eighth qualifier

Ninth qualifier

Tenth qualifier

Eleventh qualifier

Twelfth qualifier

References

 Main Draw
 Qualifying Draw

Men's Singles
Sony Open Tennis - Singles
Men in Florida